Tremica is an archaeological site in Corsica.  It consists of a dolmen with a semicircular capstone, and is located above the village of Casaglione.

References
Ancient Corsica Tour
Megalithic Portal
Les Mégalithes de Corse, Google Books 

Archaeological sites in Corsica
Dolmens in France